The Rolls-Royce Falcon is an aero engine developed in 1915. It was a smaller version of the Rolls-Royce Eagle, a liquid-cooled V-12 of 867 cu in (14.2 L) capacity. Fitted to many British World War I-era aircraft, production ceased in 1927. The Falcon was designed by R.W. Harvey-Bailey. 

An airworthy Falcon survives today and powers a Bristol F.2 Fighter during summer displays.

Design and development
Production of the Falcon began in September 1916 and was so successful that it was also manufactured under licence by Brazil Straker in Bristol. Production continued until 1927, by which time 2,185 had been built.

An unusual feature of this engine was the epicyclic propeller reduction gear which contained a clutch designed to limit the maximum torque, thus protecting the reduction gears.

The Falcon was notably used in the Bristol F.2 Fighter and Blackburn Kangaroo bomber.

Variants
Note:
Falcon I (Rolls-Royce 190 hp Mk I)
(1916-17), 230 hp, 250 engines produced in both left- and right-hand tractor versions.
Falcon II (Rolls-Royce 190 hp Mk II)
(1917), 253 hp, carburettor size increased. 250 built at Derby.
Falcon III (Rolls-Royce 190 hp Mk III)
(1917-1927), 285 hp, increased compression ratio (5.3:1), twin carburettors replaced with four Rolls-Royce/Claudel-Hobson units. 1,685 built at Derby.

Applications
List from Guttery and Lumsden:

Survivors
Bristol F.2B Fighter, D-8096, is based at the Shuttleworth Collection and is powered by a Falcon III, this aircraft flies regularly in summer.

Engines on display
A Rolls-Royce Falcon is on public display at the Shuttleworth Collection, Bedfordshire.
A Rolls-Royce Falcon is displayed at the Rolls-Royce Heritage Trust Collection (Derby).

Specifications (Falcon III)

See also

References

Notes

Bibliography

 Guttery, T.E. The Shuttleworth Collection. London: Wm. Carling & Co, 1969. 
 Jane's Fighting Aircraft of World War I. London. Studio Editions Ltd, 1993. 
 Lumsden, Alec. British Piston Engines and their Aircraft. Marlborough, Wiltshire: Airlife Publishing, 2003. .
 Pugh, Peter. The Magic of a Name - The Rolls-Royce Story: The First 40 Years. Duxford, Cambridge: Icon Books, 2001. .

External links

Photo of a Rolls-Royce Falcon at enginehistory.org

Falcon
1910s aircraft piston engines